Common names:  Siberian pit viper, Halys viper, Halys pit viper, more.

Gloydius halys is a venomous pitviper species found within a wide range that stretches across Asia, from Russia, east of the Urals, eastwards through China. Five subspecies are currently recognized, including the nominotypical form described here.

Description
The body build is described as moderately stout with a snout that is slightly upturned when viewed from the side.

Dorsally, G. halys is grayish, pale brown, reddish, or yellowish, with large dark spots or crossbars, the borders of which are serrated. One or two lateral series of smaller dark spots are present. There is a wide dark stripe behind the eye, bordered by light stripes both above and below. The venter is whitish, speckled with gray or brown.

The strongly keeled dorsal scales are arranged in 23 rows at midbody. The ventrals number 149-174. The anal plate is entire. The subcaudals number 31-44, and are divided (paired).

Common names
Common names for G. halys include Siberian pit viper, Halys viper, Halys pit viper, Pallas's pit viper, Asiatic pit viper, Asiatic moccasin, shchitomordnik, Pallas's viper, Pallas pit viper, Korean pit viper, Mongolian pit viper.

Geographic range
Gloydius halys is found in Russia, east of the Ural Mountains through Siberia, Iran, Mongolia to northern and central China, as well as the southern Ryukyu Islands of Japan. According to Gloyd and Conant (1990), the type locality given is "Salt Lake near the Lugaskoi Sawod (factory) on the Upper Yenisey" (Siberia, Russia). Redefined by Bour (1993) as "Naryn or Ryn Peski desert, near the Russia-Kazakhstan border".

Subspecies

Etymology
The subspecific name, boehmei, is in honor of German herpetologist Wolfgang Böhme.

References

Further reading
Pallas PS (1776). "Reise durch verschiedene Provinzen des russischen Reichs ". Kaiserlichen Akademie der Wissenschaften, St. Petersburg 3. (Coluber halys, new species, p. 703). (in German and Latin).

External links
 

halys
Snakes of Asia
Reptiles of Afghanistan
Reptiles of Azerbaijan
Snakes of China
Reptiles of Iran
Reptiles of Mongolia
Reptiles of Central Asia
Reptiles of Russia
Fauna of Siberia
Reptiles described in 1776
Taxa named by Peter Simon Pallas